Ginásio Multidisciplinar is an indoor sporting arena located in Campinas, Brazil. The capacity of the arena is 10,000.

Indoor arenas in Brazil
Sport in Campinas
Sports venues in São Paulo (state)